Albert John Langworthy Cowley (8 February 1886 – 9 June 1962) was an Australian rules footballer who played for the Carlton Football Club in the Victorian Football League (VFL).

Notes

External links 

		
Bert Cowley's profile at Blueseum

1886 births
Australian rules footballers from Victoria (Australia)
Carlton Football Club players
Echuca Football Club players
1962 deaths